Meraas Tower was a supertall skyscraper 600 m (1,968 ft) tall, which was proposed to be constructed in Jumeirah Garden City, Dubai. When completed it would have been one of the tallest skyscrapers in Dubai. The tower design had a series of faceted surfaces that would help light and air travel throughout the building. The faceted shapes were projected to maximize energy generation, balance natural light, and offer 360-degree views of the city below. They also would create natural atrium spaces as the building ascended, allowing the creation of naturally lit sky gardens. Exposing the intermediate floors would have made it seem as if the structure was composed of four smaller towers stacked one on top of another. Tower was to include 300,000 square meters of hotel, convention, commercial and retail spaces. However, in 2009, The project was cancelled.

See also
List of tallest buildings in Dubai
List of buildings with 100 floors or more

References

External links
Emporis.com
Archicentral.com

Proposed skyscrapers in Dubai
Unbuilt buildings and structures in Dubai